The India men's national cricket team, also known as Team India or the Men in Blue,represents India in men's international cricket. It is governed by the Board of Control for Cricket in India (BCCI), and is a Full Member of the International Cricket Council (ICC) with Test, One Day International (ODI) and Twenty20 International (T20I) status.

Cricket was introduced to the Indian subcontinent by British sailors in the 18th century, and the first cricket club was established in 1792. India's men's national cricket team played its first international match on 25 June 1932 in a Lord's Test against England becoming the sixth team to be granted Test cricket status. India had to wait until 1952, almost twenty years, for its first Test victory. In its first fifty years of international cricket, success was limited, with only 35 wins in 196 Tests. The team, however, gained strength in the 1970s with the emergence of players like Sunil Gavaskar, Gundappa Viswanath, Kapil Dev, and the Indian spin quartet.The 2022 T20 World cup match between India and Pakistan recorded a mind boggling viewership of 1.7 Billion.

In limited-overs cricket, India made its ODI and T20I debuts in 1974 and 2006, respectively. The team has won five major ICC tournaments, winning the Cricket World Cup twice (1983 and 2011), the ICC T20 World Cup once (2007) and the ICC Champions Trophy twice (2002 and 2013) and have also finished as runners-up in the World Cup once (2003), the T20 World Cup once (2014), and the Champions Trophy twice (2000 and 2017). The team were also runners-up in the inaugural 2019–2021 ICC World Test Championship. It was the second team after the West Indies to win the World Cup and the first team to win the World Cup on home soil after winning the 2011 Cricket World Cup.

They have also won the Asia Cup seven times, in 1984, 1988, 1990–91, 1995, 2010, 2016 and 2018, whilst finishing runners-up thrice (1997, 2004, 2008). The team also won the 1985 World Championship of Cricket, defeating Pakistan in the final. Other achievements include winning the ICC Test Championship Mace five times and the ICC ODI Championship Shield once.

Test rivalries include the Border–Gavaskar Trophy (with Australia), the Pataudi Trophy (with England), the Anthony de Mello Trophy (with England), and the Freedom Trophy (with South Africa), while a celebrated rivalry with Pakistan exists across all  formats., the team is ranked second in Tests, first in ODIs and first in T20Is by the ICC. Rohit Sharma is the current captain of the team in all formats; the head coach is Rahul Dravid.

History

Early history (1700s–1918)

The British brought cricket to India in the early 1700s, with the first cricket match played in 1721. In 1848, the Parsi community in 
Mumbai formed the Oriental Cricket Club, the first cricket club to be established by Indians. After slow beginnings, the Europeans eventually invited the Parsis to play a match in 1877. By 1912, the Parsis, Sikhs, Hindus and Muslims of Bombay played a quadrangular tournament with the Europeans every year. In the early 1900s, some Indians went on to play for the England cricket team. Some of these, such as Ranjitsinhji and KS Duleepsinhji were greatly appreciated by the British and their names went on to be used for the Ranji Trophy and Duleep Trophy – two major first-class tournaments in India. In 1911, an Indian team, captained by Bhupinder Singh of Patiala, went on their first official tour of the British Isles, but only played English county teams and not the England cricket team.

Test match status (1918–1970)

 
India was invited to the Imperial Cricket Council in 1926, and made their debut as a Test playing nation in England in 1932, led by CK Nayudu, who was considered the best Indian batsman at the time. The one-off Test match between the two sides was played at Lord's in London. The team was not strong in their batting at this point and went on to lose by 158 runs. India hosted its first Test series in the year 1933. England was the visiting team that played two Tests in Bombay (now Mumbai) and Calcutta (now Kolkata). The visitors won the series 2–0. The Indian team continued to improve throughout the 1930s and '40s but did not achieve an international victory during this period. In the early 1940s, India didn't play any Test cricket due to the Second World War. The team's first series as an independent country was in late 1947 against Sir Donald Bradman's Invincibles (a name given to the Australia national cricket team of that time). It was also the first Test series India played which was not against England. Australia won the five-match series 4–0, with Bradman tormenting the Indian bowling in his final Australian summer. India subsequently played their first Test series at home not against England, but against the West Indies in 1948. West Indies won the five Test series 1–0.

India recorded their first Test victory, in their 24th match, against England at Madras in 1952. Later in the same year, they won their first Test series, which was against Pakistan. They continued their improvement throughout the early 1950s with a series win against New Zealand in 1956. However, they did not win again in the remainder of the decade and lost badly to strong Australian and English sides. On 24 August 1959, India lost by an innings in the Test to complete the only 5–0 whitewash ever inflicted by England. The next decade saw India's reputation develop as a team with a strong record at home. They won their first Test series against England at home in 1961–62 and also won a home series against New Zealand. They managed to draw home series against Pakistan and Australia and another series against England. In this same period, India also won its first series outside the subcontinent, against New Zealand in 1967–68.

The key to India's bowling in the 1970s were the Indian spin quartet – Bishen Bedi, E.A.S. Prasanna, BS Chandrasekhar and Srinivas Venkataraghavan. This period also saw the emergence of two of India's best ever batsmen, Sunil Gavaskar and Gundappa Viswanath. Indian pitches have had the tendency to support spin and the spin quartet exploited this to create collapses in opposing batting line-ups. These players were responsible for the back-to-back series wins in 1971 in the West Indies and in England, under the captaincy of Ajit Wadekar. Gavaskar scored 774 runs in the West Indian series while Dilip Sardesai's 112 played a big part in their one Test win.

One-day cricket and ICC Cricket World Cup success (1970–1985)

The advent of One Day International (ODI) cricket in 1971 created a new dimension in the cricket world. However, India was not considered strong in ODIs at this point and batsmen such as the captain Gavaskar were known for their defensive approach to batting. India began as a weak team in ODIs and did not qualify for the second round in the first two editions of the Cricket World Cup. Gavaskar infamously blocked his way to 36 not out off 174 balls against England in the first World Cup in 1975; India scored just 132 for 3 and lost by 202 runs.

In contrast, India fielded a strong team in Test matches and was particularly strong at home, where their combination of stylish batsmen and beguiling spinners were at their best. India set a then Test record in the third Test against the West Indies at Port-of-Spain in 1976, when they chased 403 to win, thanks to 112 from Viswanath. In November 1976, the team established another record by scoring 524 for 9 declared against New Zealand at Kanpur without any individual batsman scoring a century. There were six fifties, the highest being 70 by Mohinder Amarnath. This innings was only the eighth instance in Test cricket where all eleven batsmen reached double figures.

During the 1980s, India developed a more attack-minded batting line-up with stroke makers such as the wristy Mohammed Azharuddin, Dilip Vengsarkar and all-rounders Kapil Dev and Ravi Shastri. India won the Cricket World Cup in 1983, defeating the favourites and the two-time defending champions West Indies in the final at Lord's, owing to a strong bowling performance. In spite of this, the team performed poorly in the Test arena, including 28 consecutive Test matches without a victory. In 1984, India won the Asia Cup and in 1985, won the World Championship of Cricket in Australia. Apart from this, India remained a weak team outside the Indian subcontinent. India's Test series victory in 1986 against England remained the last Test series win by India outside the subcontinent for the next 19 years. The 1980s saw Gavaskar and Kapil Dev (India's best all-rounder to date) at the pinnacle of their careers. Gavaskar made a Test record 34 centuries as he became the first man to reach the 10,000 run mark. Kapil Dev later became the highest wicket-taker in Test cricket with 434 wickets. The period was also marked by an unstable leadership, with Gavaskar and Kapil exchanging the captaincy several times.

Late 20th century (1985–2000)

The addition of Sachin Tendulkar and Anil Kumble to the national side in 1989 and 1990 further improved the team. The following year, Javagal Srinath, India's fastest bowler since Amar Singh made his debut. Despite this, during the 1990s, India did not win any of its 33 Tests outside the subcontinent while it won 17 out of its 30 Tests at home. After being eliminated by neighbours Sri Lanka on home soil at the 1996 Cricket World Cup semifinal, the team underwent a year of change as Sourav Ganguly and Rahul Dravid, later to become captains of the team, made their debut in the same Test at Lord's. Tendulkar replaced Azharuddin as captain in late 1996, but after a personal and team form slump, Tendulkar relinquished the captaincy and Azharuddin was reinstated at the beginning of 1998.

After failing to reach the semifinals at the 1999 Cricket World Cup, Tendulkar was again made captain, and had another poor run, losing 3–0 on a tour of Australia and then 2–0 at home to South Africa. Tendulkar resigned, vowing never to captain the team again. Ganguly was appointed the new captain and the team was further damaged in 2000 when former captain Azharuddin and fellow batsman Ajay Jadeja were implicated in a match-fixing scandal and given life and five years bans respectively. This period was described by the BBC as "the Indian cricket's worst hour". However, the new core – Tendulkar, Dravid, Kumble and Ganguly – swore not to let this happen to them again, and lead Indian cricket out of the dark times. The first three put aside personal ambitions to let Ganguly lead them into a new era.

21st century

The Indian team underwent major improvements under the captaincy of Sourav Ganguly and guidance of John Wright, India's first foreign coach. India maintained their unbeaten home record against Australia in Test series after victory in 2001. The series was famous for the Kolkata Test match, in which India became only the third team in the history of Test cricket to win a Test match after following on. Australian captain Steve Waugh labelled India as the "Final Frontier" because of his side's inability to win a Test series in India. In the year 2002, India were joint-winners of the ICC Champions Trophy with Sri Lanka and then went to the 2003 Cricket World Cup in South Africa, where they reached the final, only to be beaten by Australia. A convincing ODI series win in Pakistan in early 2006, following a loss in the Test series, gave India the world record of 17 successive ODI victories while batting second.

In December 2006, India played and won its first Twenty20 international in South Africa. The beginning of 2007 had seen a revival in the Indian team's ODI fortunes before the 2007 Cricket World Cup. Series victories against the West Indies and Sri Lanka, marked by the comeback of Ganguly and strong form by Tendulkar, as well as the emergence of young players like Robin Uthappa persuaded many pundits to tip India as a contender to win the 2007 Cricket World Cup. However, defeats to Bangladesh and Sri Lanka saw India fail to reach the second round.

After winning the Test series against England in August 2007, Dravid stepped down as captain and Dhoni was made captain of the Twenty20 and ODI team. In September 2007, India won the first-ever Twenty20 World Cup held in South Africa, beating Pakistan by 5 runs in the final. In 2007–08, they toured Australia where India lost the highly controversial home Test series 2–1 but managed to win the CB series the following month with a whitewash of Australia. In April 2009, India secured their first Test series win in New Zealand in 41 years. On 2 April 2011, India won the 2011 Cricket World Cup by defeating Sri Lanka in the final, thus becoming the third team after West Indies and Australia to win the World Cup twice. India also became the first team to win the World Cup on home soil. India defeated England in the 2013 ICC Champions Trophy Final and Dhoni became the first captain in history to win the three major ICC trophies, namely the ICC Cricket World Cup, ICC World Twenty20 and ICC Champions Trophy.

In the 2014 ICC World Twenty20 hosted in Bangladesh, India narrowly missed out on another ICC trophy by losing to Sri Lanka in the final. This tournament saw the rise of Virat Kohli as one of the best-limited overs batsmen in world cricket, as he was adjudged the man of the series. India toured Australia towards the end of 2014 for a 4 match Test series, which is remembered for MS Dhoni's sudden retirement from Test cricket after the end of the second Test. India began to dominate at home in Test matches under new captain Virat Kohli after they comprehensively beat South Africa in 2015. This series was the beginning of an unbeaten streak of 19 Test matches. India was knocked out of the 2015 World Cup in the semi-final to eventual winners Australia. India then began 2016 by winning the 2016 Asia Cup, remaining unbeaten throughout the tournament. The team were favorites to win the 2016 ICC World Twenty20, which was being held at home, but lost in the semi-final to eventual champions West Indies. Before the series against England, MS Dhoni resigned as captain in limited-overs, thus handing the captaincy to Virat Kohli across all formats. India beat England across all three formats, with a notable 4–0 win in the Test series. India defeated Pakistan in their first game of the 2017 ICC Champions Trophy but lost to the same opponents in the final, the first time they had met at this stage of a tournament since 2007.

The Indian team's next major global tournament was the 2019 Cricket World Cup where the team finished first in the group stage with 7 wins and only 1 loss which came against host nation England. They made the semis but lost to New Zealand by 18 runs. Rohit Sharma was the highest run-scorer for the team with 648 runs. India were supposed to play South Africa at home in March 2020, but the tour got cancelled due to COVID-19 pandemic in India. After eight months, India played against Australia in late 2020. They were 36 all out in the first Test which Australia won by 8 wickets. They won the second Test in Melbourne by 8 wickets, drew out the third Test in Sydney and won the fourth Test in Brisbane by three wickets in spite of not having many frontline players. By winning the Test series in Australia, India became one of the teams alongside South Africa to win two Test series in Australia. India played its first home series of 2021 against England. The matches were played in Chennai, Ahmedabad and Pune. They started the series by losing the first test in Chennai by 227 runs. But they won the next three Test matches by winning the Test series 3–1. Not only they won the Test series, they also qualified for the 2021 ICC World Test Championship Final. They also played the T20I series which they won 3–2 and the ODI series which they won 2–1. Then, India played the 2021 ICC World Test Championship Final against New Zealand in Southampton in which they lost by 8 wickets.

A month before the 2021 T20 World Cup, Virat Kohli announced that the tournament would be his last stint as T20I captain. India played their first match vs. Pakistan, losing by 10 wickets. After that, they suffered an 8-wicket loss against New Zealand before beating Afghanistan and Scotland. With India still in the race for the semi-finals, it needed Afghanistan to beat New Zealand for India to progress. But New Zealand beat Afghanistan, and India beat Namibia by 9 wickets to end their campaign. Soon after, Rohit Sharma was announced as the new T20I captain and Rahul Dravid as the new head coach. With a new captain at the helm and a new coach to guide them, India whitewashed New Zealand in the T20I series 3–0 at home, and followed this with a 1–0 victory in the subsequent Test series.

Ahead of the India away series against South Africa, the selection committee replaced Virat Kohli as India's ODI captain and named Rohit Sharma as India's official limited-overs captain. Kohli later quit as Test captain as well, after their Test series loss to South Africa. India was placed in Group A of Asia cup 2022 which was played in T20I format. India defeated Pakistan and Hong Kong to enter Super 4 stage. But in Super 4 stage, they lost against Pakistan and Sri Lanka thereby, failing to advance to finals and cannot defend the title. India qualified for the semi-finals in the 2022 T20 World Cup, but lost to England by 10 wickets.

Governing body

The Board of Control for Cricket in India (BCCI) is the governing body for the Indian cricket team and first-class cricket in India. The Board has been operating since 1929 and represents India at the International Cricket Council (ICC). It is amongst the richest sporting organisations in the world. It sold media rights for India's matches from 2006 to 2010 for $612,000,000.

The International Cricket Council determines India's upcoming matches through its future tours program. However, the BCCI, with its influential financial position in the cricketing world, has often challenged the ICC's program and called for more series between India, Australia and England which are more likely to earn more revenue as opposed to tours with Bangladesh or Zimbabwe. In the past, the BCCI has also come into conflict with the ICC regarding sponsorships.

Selection committee

Selection for the Indian cricket team occurs through the BCCI's zonal selection policy, where each of the five zones is represented with one selector and one of the members nominated by BCCI as the chairman of the selection committee. This has sometimes led to controversy as to whether these selectors are biased towards their zones.

Until 18 November 2022, Chetan Sharma was senior major selector and Debashish Mohanty, Harvinder Singh and Sunil Joshi were members. This panel was sacked after unsuccessful tour of Indian men's team in 2022 T20 world cup.

Sponsorship 

The current sponsor of the team is BYJU's. OPPO's sponsorship was to run from 2017 until 2022, but was handed over to BYJU's on 5 September 2019.On 7 March 2022 BYJU's extended its sponsorship for one year.

 Previously, the Indian team was sponsored by Star India from 2014 to 2017, Sahara India Pariwar from 2002 to 2013 and ITC Limited (with Wills and ITC Hotels brands) from 1993 to 2002.

Nike had been a long time kit supplier to team India having acquired the contract in 2005, with two extensions for a period of five years each time; in 2011 and 2016 respectively. Nike ended its contract in September 2020 and MPL Sports Apparel & Accessories, a subsidiary of online gaming platform Mobile Premier League replaced Nike as the kit manufacturer in October 2020. In January 2023, MPL appointed Kewal Kiran Clothing Limited (KKCL) and Killer (a brand owned by KKCL) as interim sponsors. Adidas will begin a five year sponsorship deal in June 2023, replacing KKCL.

On 30 August 2019, following the conclusion of the Expression of Interest process for Official Partners’ Rights, the Board of Control for Cricket in India (BCCI) announced that Sporta Technologies Pvt. Ltd. (Dream11), LafargeHolcim (ACC Cement, and Ambuja Cement) and Hyundai Motor India Ltd. have acquired the Official Partners' Rights for the BCCI International and Domestic matches during 2019–2023.

The title sponsors of all international and domestic matches played in India is Mastercard for the 2022–23 season. The title sponsorship was initially given to Paytm  for all matches played between 2015 and 2023  but was handed over to Mastercard in 2022.

Star India and Airtel have been title sponsors previously.

Star Sports Network is the official broadcaster until 2023 for all matches the team plays in India.

International grounds

There are numerous world-renowned cricket stadiums located in India. Most grounds are under the administration of various state cricket boards as opposed to being under the control of the BCCI. The Bombay Gymkhana was the first ground in India to host a full-scale cricket match featuring an Indian cricket team. This was between the Parsis and the Europeans in 1877. The first stadium to host a Test match in India was also the Gymkhana Ground in Bombay in 1933, the only Test it ever hosted. The second and third Tests in the 1933 series were hosted at Eden Gardens and Chepauk. The Feroz Shah Kotla Ground in Delhi was the first stadium to host a Test match after independence, a draw against the West Indies in 1948, the first of a 5-Test series. 21 stadiums in India have hosted at least one official Test match. In recent years, there has been an increase in the number of world-class cricket stadiums in India.

India currently has the world's largest cricket stadium. The Narendra Modi Stadium, is a cricket stadium in Ahmedabad, Gujarat, India. Eden Gardens in Kolkata has hosted the most Tests, and also has the third-largest seating capacity of any cricket stadium in the world. Founded in 1864, it is one of the most historical stadiums in India, having hosted numerous historical and controversial matches. Other major stadiums in India include the Feroz Shah Kotla Ground, which was established in 1883 and hosted memorable matches including Anil Kumble's ten wickets in an innings haul against Pakistan.

The Bombay Gymkhana hosted the first Test match in India which is the only Test it has hosted to date. Wankhede Stadium, established in 1974, has a capacity to hold 33,000 spectators and is currently the most popular venue in the city. It has hosted 24 Test matches. It was the unofficial successor of the Brabourne Stadium, which is also located in Mumbai. Mumbai is often considered the cricketing capital of India because of its fans and the talent it produces (see Mumbai cricket team) and thus the stadium regularly hosts major Test matches. The M. A. Chidambaram Stadium in Chepauk is also considered to be an important historical Indian cricket ground, established in the early 1900s, and it was the site of India's first Test victory.

Captains

A total of 35 men have captained the Indian cricket team in at least one Test match, although only six have led the team in more than 25 matches, and six have captained the team in ODIs but not Tests. India's first captain was CK Nayudu, who led the team in four matches against England: one in England in 1932 and a series of three matches at home in 1933–34. Lala Amarnath, India's fourth captain and the first Indian to score a century in test cricket while playing for India, led the team in its first Test match after Indian independence. He also captained the side to its first Test victory and first series win, both in a three-match series at home against Pakistan in 1952–53. From 1952 until 1961–62, India had a number of captains such as Vijay Hazare, Polly Umrigar and Nari Contractor.

The Nawab of Pataudi, Mansoor Ali Khan Pataudi, was the team's captain for 36 Test matches from 1961–62 to 1969–70, returning for another four matches against West Indies in 1974–75. In the early years of his captaincy tenure, the team was whitewashed in the West Indies, England and Australia. However, in 1967–68, Pataudi led India on its maiden New Zealand tour, which ended in India winning the Test series 3–1. In 1970–71, Ajit Wadekar took over the captaincy from Pataudi. Under Wadekar's captaincy, India registered its first Test series win in the West Indies and England. India played its first ODI in 1974, also under his captaincy. India won its first ODI under the captaincy of Srinivasaraghavan Venkataraghavan in the 1975 Cricket World Cup, against East Africa. Between 1975–76 and 1978–79, Bishen Singh Bedi captained the team in 22 Tests and 4 ODIs, winning 6 Tests and one ODI.

Sunil Gavaskar took over as Test and ODI captain in 1978–79, leading India in 47 Test matches and 37 ODIs, winning 9 Tests and 14 ODIs. He was succeeded by Kapil Dev in the 1980s, who captained for 34 Test matches, including 4 victories. Kapil Dev led India to victory in 39 of his 74 ODIs in charge, including the 1983 Cricket World Cup. Kapil Dev also captained India's 2–0 Test series victory in England in 1986. Between 1987–88 and 1989–90, India had three captains in Dilip Vengsarkar, Ravi Shastri and Krishnamachari Srikkanth. Vengsarkar took over the captaincy from Kapil Dev after the 1987 Cricket World Cup. Although he started with two centuries in his first series as captain, his captaincy period was turbulent and he lost the job following a disastrous tour of the West Indies in early-1989 and a stand-off with the Indian cricket board (BCCI).

India has had six regular Test captains since Mohammad Azharuddin took charge in 1989. Azharuddin led the team in 47 Test matches from 1989–90 to 1998–99, winning 14, and in 174 ODIs, winning 90. He was followed by Sachin Tendulkar, who captained the team in 25 Test matches and 73 ODIs in the late 1990s; Tendulkar was relatively unsuccessful as a captain, winning only 4 Test matches and 23 ODIs.

Ganguly became the regular captain of the team in both Tests and ODIs in 2000. He remained captain until 2005–06 and became the then most successful Indian captain, winning 21 of his 49 Test matches in charge and 76 of his 146 ODIs. Under his captaincy, India became the joint-winners of the 2002 ICC Champions Trophy with Sri Lanka, and the runners-up of the 2003 Cricket World Cup. India lost only three Tests at home under Ganguly and managed to draw Test series in England and Australia. Rahul Dravid took over as Test captain in 2005. In 2006, he led India to its first Test series victory in the West Indies in more than 30 years.

In September 2007, Mahendra Singh Dhoni was named as the new captain of the ODI and T20I teams, after Dravid stepped down from the post. Soon after taking up the captaincy, Dhoni led the team to the inaugural World Twenty20 title. Anil Kumble was appointed Test captain in November 2007, but retired from international cricket in November 2008 after captaining in 14 Tests. Dhoni succeeded him as the Test captain, making him the captain in all formats. Under the captaincy of Dhoni, the Indian team held the number one position in the Test rankings for 21 months (from November 2009 to August 2011), and set a national record for most back-to-back ODI wins (nine straight wins). Dhoni also led the team to victory in 2011 Cricket World Cup and 2013 ICC Champions Trophy. Thus, Dhoni became the first captain in history to win all three major ICC trophies, namely- ICC Cricket World Cup in 2011, ICC World Twenty20 in 2007 and ICC Champions Trophy in 2013. However, the team performed poorly in away Tests from 2011 to 2014 and Dhoni retired from Test cricket in December 2014, with Virat Kohli being named as the new Test captain. Dhoni resigned as captain of the ODI and T20I teams in January 2017 and Kohli succeeded him at the position.

Under Kohli's captaincy, India was unbeaten in 19 Test matches, starting from a 3–0 series win over New Zealand and ending with a 2–1 series win over Australia. India also had an unbeaten streak of winning 9 consecutive Test series, starting with a 2–1 series win over Sri Lanka and ending with a 1–0 series win over Sri Lanka. India also became only the third team after Australia and South Africa to have won their most recent Test series simultaneously against all the other Test playing nations. As per winning percentage in Test matches, Kohli was India's second most successful Test captain, behind Ajinkya Rahane, having won more than 58% of Test matches (at least 2 games).

In November 2021, Rohit Sharma was appointed as the new T20I captain of the Indian cricket team after Kohli resigned from the role. Kohli led India one last time in T20Is at the T20 World Cup 2021. Under Rohit's first series as permanent captaincy, India whitewashed New Zealand at home in the T20I series 3–0. In December 2021, Sharma was also appointed as the new ODI captain of the Indian cricket team, replacing Kohli ahead of their away series against South Africa. Kohli  later quit as Test captain as well, after their Test series loss to South Africa. Sharma replaced Kohli as Test captain before the Test series against Sri Lanka and is now the Full-Time Captain of the team.

Current squad

This lists all the players who have played for India in the past 12 months or was named in the most recent Test, ODI or T20I squad. In March 2022, BCCI published a new contract list which will be valid from October 2021 until September 2022.

Key

Pay grade 
BCCI awards central contracts to its players, its pay graded according to the importance of the player. Players' salaries are as follows:
 Grade A+ – 
 Grade A – 
 Grade B – 
 Grade C – 
Match fees

Coaching staff

Results and fixtures

2023

The recent results and forthcoming fixtures of India in international cricket:

Tournament history

World Test Championship

Cricket World Cup

T20 World Cup

Champions Trophy

Asia Cup

Other tournaments

Commonwealth Games

World Championship of Cricket

Austral-Asia Cup

Australian Tri-Series

NatWest Series

Nidahas Trophy

Honours

ICC

World Test Championship:
 Runners-up (1): 2019–2021
World Cup:
 Champions (2): 1983, 2011
 Runners-up (1): 2003
T20 World Cup:
 Champions (1): 2007
 Runners-up (1): 2014
Champions Trophy:
 Champions (2): 2002, 2013
 Runners-up (2): 2000, 2017

ACC

Asia Cup:
  Champions (7): 1984, 1988, 1990–91, 1995, 2010, 2016, 2018
 Runners-up (3): 1997, 2004, 2008

Statistics

Tests

Test record versus other nations

Most test runs for India

Most Test wickets for India

One-Day Internationals

ODI record versus other nations

Most ODI runs for India

Most ODI wickets for India

Twenty20 Internationals

T20I record versus other nations

Most T20I runs for India

Most T20I wickets for India

Players in bold text are still active with India in T20I format.

Individual records

Sachin Tendulkar, who began playing for India as a 16-year-old in 1989 and has since become the most prolific run-scorer in the history of both Test and ODI cricket, holds a large number of national batting records. He holds the record of most appearances in both Tests and ODIs, most runs in both Tests and ODIs and most centuries in Tests and ODIs. The highest score by an Indian is the 319 scored by Virender Sehwag in Chennai. It is the second triple century in Test cricket by an Indian, the first being a 309 also made by Sehwag although against Pakistan. The team's highest ever score was a 759/7 against England at MA Chidambaram Stadium, Chennai in 2016, while its lowest score was 36 against Australia in 2020. In ODIs, the team's highest score is 418/5 against West Indies at Indore in 2011–12. India score 413–5 in a match against Bermuda in 2007 World Cup which is the highest score ever in Cricket World Cup history. In the same match, India set a world record of the highest winning margin in an ODI match of 257 runs.

India has also had some very strong bowling figures, with spin bowler Anil Kumble being a member of the elite group of 4 bowlers who have taken 600 Test wickets. In 1999, Anil Kumble emulated Jim Laker to become the second bowler to take all ten wickets in a Test match innings when he took 10 wickets for 74 runs against Pakistan at the Feroz Shah Kotla in Delhi.

Many of the Indian cricket team's records are also world records, for example Sachin Tendulkar's century tally (in Tests and ODIs) and run tally (also in both Tests and ODIs). Mahendra Singh Dhoni's 183 not out against Sri Lanka in 2005 is the world record score by a wicketkeeper in ODIs. The Indian cricket team also holds the record sequence of 17 successful run-chases in ODIs, which ended in a dramatic match against the West Indies in May 2006, which India lost by just 1 run.

Sachin Tendulkar was the first batsman to score 200 runs (he was unbeaten on 200 from 147 deliveries including 25 fours and 3 sixes) in a single ODI innings, on 24 February 2010 against South Africa in Gwalior. On 8 December 2011, this achievement was eclipsed by compatriot Virender Sehwag, who scored 219 runs from 149 deliveries (25 fours and 7 sixes) versus West Indies in Indore. On 13 November 2014 the record was broken by another Indian opening batsmen, Rohit Sharma, who scored 264 runs from 173 deliveries (33 fours and 9 sixes) against Sri Lanka in Kolkata. In 2013, MS Dhoni became the first captain in history to win all three major ICC trophies- ICC Cricket World Cup in 2011, ICC World Twenty20 in 2007 and ICC Champions Trophy in 2013.

In 2014, Virat Kohli became the first cricketer to win back-to-back man of the series awards in the 2014 ICC World Twenty20 and 2016 ICC World Twenty20. Kohli is also the highest scorer in T20Is as of November 2022. In 2017, Ravichandran Ashwin became the fastest cricketer in history to reach 250 wickets.

Fan following

Owing to the massive Indian diaspora in nations like Australia, England and South Africa, a large Indian fan turnout is expected whenever India plays in each of these nations. There have been a number of official fan groups that have been formed over the years, including the Swami Army or Bharat Army, the Indian equivalent of the Barmy Army, that were very active in their support when India toured Australia in 2003/2004. They are known to attribute a number of popular Indian songs to the cricket team.

Fan rivalry and cross-border tension has created a strong rivalry between the Indian and the Pakistani cricket teams. In tours between these two nations, cricket visas are often employed to accommodate for the tens of thousands of fans wishing to cross the border to watch cricket. This intense fan dedication is one of the major causes of the BCCI's financial success.

However, there are downsides to having such a cricket-loving population. Many Indians hold cricket very close to their hearts and losses are not received well by the Indian population. In some cases, particularly after losses to Pakistan or after a long string of weak performances, there have been reports of player effigies being burnt in the streets and vandalism of player homes. In many cases, players have come under intense attention from the media for negative reasons, this has been considered one of the reasons for Sourav Ganguly being left out of the Indian team. At times, when a match is surrounded by controversy, it has resulted in a debacle. For example, when India slid to defeat against Australia at Brabourne Stadium in 1969, fans began throwing stones and bottles onto the field as well as setting fire to the stands, before laying siege to the Australian dressing rooms. During the same tour, a stampede occurred at Eden Gardens when tickets were oversold and India fell to another loss; the Australian team bus was later stoned with bricks. A similar event occurred during the 1996 Cricket World Cup, where India were losing the semi-final to Sri Lanka at Eden Gardens. In this case, the fan behaviour was directed at the Indian team in disappointment at their lacklustre performance. An armed guard had to be placed at the home of captain Mohammad Azharuddin to ensure his safety. Indian fans have also been passionate in their following of Sachin Tendulkar, who has been commonly thought of as one of the best batsmen in the world. Glorified for the bulk of his career, a riot occurred in early 1999 in a Test against Pakistan at Eden Gardens after a collision with Pakistani paceman Shoaib Akhtar saw him run out, forcing police to eject spectators and the game to be played in an empty stadium. Although in 2006, a string of low scores resulted in Tendulkar being booed by the Mumbai crowd when he got out against England.

Often, fans engage in protests regarding players if they believe that regionalism has affected selection, or because of regional partisan support for local players. In 2005, when Sourav Ganguly was dropped from the team, Ganguly's home town Kolkata erupted in protests. India later played a match against South Africa in Kolkata, West Bengal. The Indian team was booed by the crowd who supported South Africa instead of India in response to Ganguly's dropping. Similar regional divisions in India regarding selection have also caused protests against the team, with political activists from the regional Kalinga Kamgar Sena party in Odisha disrupting the arrival of the team in Cuttack for an ODI over the lack of a local player in the team, with one activist manhandling coach Greg Chappell. Similar treatment was handed to Sunil Gavaskar in the 1987 World Cup Semi Finals by crowds at Wankhede Stadium when he got bowled by Philip DeFreitas.

A successful string of results,  especially victories against  arch-rivals Pakistan or victories  in major tournaments such as the World Cup are greeted with particular ecstasy from the Indian fans.

See also
 Sport in India – Overview of sports in India 
 India A cricket team
 India national under-19 cricket team
 National Cricket Academy (NCA)
 BCCI Awards
 Glossary of cricket terms

Notes

References

Further reading

External links

 

India in international cricket
National cricket teams
Laureus World Sports Awards winners
Cricket in India
C